The NCL or National Conference League Division One (known as the Kingstone Press NCL Division One) is the secondary British amateur rugby league competition in the Rugby Football League pyramid.

Results

League Winners

2019 Teams
Pilkington Recs,

York Acorn,

Feastherston lions,

Milford rlfc,

Stanningley rlfc,

Wigan St Patricks,

Myton Warriors,

Oulton Raiders,

Skirlaugh A.R.L.F.C.,

Saddleworth Rangers,

Normanton Knights,

Dewsbury Moor,

Sponsorship 
The National Conference League (known as the Kingstone Press National Conference League for sponsorship reasons)

References 

1
1989 establishments in England
Sports leagues established in 1989